The Seoul Tourism Organization (STO) is a public interest corporation established by local governments in Seoul, South Korea. It's also called a Seoul Tourism Foundation.  The organization was established on May 1, 2018. The purpose of the organization is to make Seoul an international tourist city. It is linked with Korea Tourism Organization.

The latest activities 
The Seoul Tourism Foundation converted the existing 'MICE Comprehensive Support Center' into a 'Corona 19 Emergency Response Center' to support the emergency prevention of COVID-19 in South Korea.

Overview 

 Increased happiness of domestic tourist and foreigners
 Realization of happy life tourism for tourist and citizens
 Discover unique tourist contents and make unique tourist spots in Seoul
 Strengthening ecotourism support
 Sustainable ecotourism support and industry capacity building
 Expansion of tourism governance at home and abroad
 Expansion of the added value of Seoul tourism
 Strengthening the role and capacity of public institutions
 Expansion of organizational culture of communication and collaboration
 Foundation for organizational innovation through change

Main Roles 

Tourism product and resource development Seoul's official experience tourism content portal site, Onemore Trip Seoul Tour Free Pass Discover Seoul Patt Hallyu tourism
 Excellent Tourism Product Certification System
 Activation of alternative accommodation

Seoul walking tour with cultural tourism guide Tourist Information and Services
 Seoul Official Tourist Information Site-Visit Seoul.net

Tourist Information Center
Seoul tour guide and map Seoul 7017 Tourist Facilities
 Festivals and events

Seoul Fair Tourism International Forum Seoul Summer Sale Seoul Lantern Festival 
 Overseas PR Marketing

Overseas briefing sessions and trade fair participation Vitalization of Medical Tourism

See also 

 Korea Tourism Organization
  Outline of South Korea

Official Web site 
  Seoul Tourism Multilingual Official : 
  Official Agency's Website:
  Overview of the Agency via YouTube:

References

2018 establishments in South Korea
Tourism in Seoul